Diego Alonso Díaz García (born 13 October 1988) is a Chilean former footballer who played as a defender. 

He has played for Chilean first-tier team Palestino.

References
 
 

1988 births
Living people
Footballers from Santiago
Chilean footballers
Club Deportivo Palestino footballers
Deportes Copiapó footballers
Deportes Temuco footballers
Lota Schwager footballers
Chilean Primera División players
Primera B de Chile players
Segunda División Profesional de Chile players
Association football defenders